Erich Hunold (11 September 1869 in Erfurt - 4 December 1923 in Braunschweig) was a German opera singer (baritone).

Biography
Hunold, the son of a postal clerk, was assigned to study theology after graduating from the Realgymnasium in Weimar. However, as he had been made aware of his beautiful voice by various art experts, he decided to become a stage singer.

He took lessons with Hans von Milde and Professor Carl Müllerhartung. He found his first engagement in Teplice, then he came to the Landestheater in Linz, from there to the city theater in Halle and in 1895 he joined the association of the German National Theater in Prague where he stayed until at least 1905.

In Prague he appeared on 3 January 1901 in the leading role of "Mathis" in the premiere of the opera Der Polnische Jude ("The Polish Jew") by Karel Weis and on 15 November 1903 in the premiere of the opera Tiefland by Eugen d'Albert as "Sebastiano", alongside Irene Alföldy and Desider Aranyi.

Later he was engaged at the court theatre of Braunschweig.

References

1869 births
1923 deaths
German operatic baritones
Musicians from Erfurt
People from the Province of Saxony
Musicians from Braunschweig
19th-century German male opera singers
20th-century German male opera singers